In Greek mythology, Damocrateia (Ancient Greek: Δαμοκράτεια) was the daughter of Aegina and Zeus, and thus, sister of Aeacus, King of Aegina. She became the mother of Patroclus by her half-brother Menoetius, son of King Actor of Opus. Otherwise, the hero was called the son of Philomela or Polymele, Sthenele or Periopis.

Notes

References 

 Apollodorus, The Library with an English Translation by Sir James George Frazer, F.B.A., F.R.S. in 2 Volumes, Cambridge, MA, Harvard University Press; London, William Heinemann Ltd. 1921. . Online version at the Perseus Digital Library. Greek text available from the same website.
Gaius Julius Hyginus, Fabulae from The Myths of Hyginus translated and edited by Mary Grant. University of Kansas Publications in Humanistic Studies. Online version at the Topos Text Project.
Tzetzes, John, Allegories of the Iliad translated by Goldwyn, Adam J. and Kokkini, Dimitra. Dumbarton Oaks Medieval Library, Harvard University Press, 2015. 

Women in Greek mythology
Aeginetan characters in Greek mythology
Locrian mythology